, or , is one of the seven constituent companies of Japan Railways Group (JR Group). It provides transportation of cargo nationwide throughout Japan. Its headquarters are in Shibuya, Tokyo near Shinjuku Station.

The Japan Railways Group was founded on 1 April 1987, when Japanese National Railways (JNR) was privatized. Japanese National Railways was divided into six regional passenger rail companies and a single freight railway company, Japan Freight Railway Company.

Economics
In 2017, only about 5% of all freight in Japan is carried by rail but nearly all of that, 99%, is carried by JR Freight.  Trucks carry about 50% and ships about 44%.  JR Freight has seen its share of the freight market gradually decrease since 1993.  In the 2010s JR Freight has been carrying more freight because of the decrease in the number of available truck drivers due to age as well as government policy to reduce carbon dioxide.  JR Freight has run a deficit for many years.

Lines

While major part of the operation of JR Freight is on the tracks owned and maintained by other JR companies, JR Freight owns the railway lines (as Category-1 railway business) as follows:

Rolling stock
, JR Freight owns and operates the following rolling stock, with most of the newer motive stock being exclusively built by Toshiba Infrastructure Systems & Solutions:

Diesel locomotives
 JNR Class DE10 B-C diesel-hydraulic locomotives
 JNR Class DE11 B-C diesel-hydraulic locomotives
 JR Freight Class DB500 B diesel-hydraulic locomotive
 JR Freight Class DD200 Bo-Bo diesel-electric locomotives
 JR Freight Class DF200 Bo-Bo-Bo diesel-electric locomotives
 JR Freight Class HD300 Bo-Bo, hybrid diesel-battery locomotives

Electric locomotives
 JNR Class EF64 Bo-Bo-Bo DC electric locomotives
 JNR Class EF65 Bo-Bo-Bo DC electric locomotives
 JNR Class EF66 Bo-Bo-Bo DC electric locomotives
 JNR Class EF67 Bo-Bo-Bo DC electric locomotives
 JNR Class ED76 Bo-2-Bo AC electric locomotives
 JNR Class EF81 Bo-Bo-Bo AC/DC electric locomotives
 JR Freight Class EF210 Bo-Bo-Bo DC electric locomotives
 JR Freight Class EH200 Bo-Bo+Bo-Bo DC electric locomotives
 JR Freight Class EF510 Bo-Bo-Bo AC/DC electric locomotives
 JR Freight Class EH500 Bo-Bo+Bo-Bo AC/DC electric locomotives
 JR Freight Class EH800 Bo-Bo+Bo-Bo AC electric locomotives

Electric multiple units
 M250 series freight EMU

Former rolling stock
 JNR Class ED62 Bo-1-Bo DC electric locomotives
 JNR Class ED75 Bo-Bo AC electric locomotives
 JNR Class ED79 Bo-Bo AC electric locomotives
 JR Freight Class EF200 Bo-Bo-Bo DC electric locomotives
 JNR Class DD51 B-2-B diesel-hydraulic locomotives

See also

 Japan Railways locomotive numbering and classification

References

External links

 

 
Railway companies established in 1987
Logistics companies of Japan
Government-owned companies of Japan
Rail freight companies
1987 establishments in Japan